Jonathan Phillip Ogden (born July 31, 1974) is an American former professional football player who played as an offensive tackle and spent his entire career with the Baltimore Ravens of the National Football League (NFL).  He played college football for the UCLA Bruins, and was recognized as a unanimous All-American.  He was drafted by the Ravens 4th overall in the 1996 NFL Draft, making him the first-ever Ravens draft selection.  He was an 11-time Pro Bowl selection and a nine-time All-Pro. Ogden won Super Bowl XXXV with the Ravens in 2001.

On February 2, 2013, Ogden was voted into the Pro Football Hall of Fame, the first inductee to spend his entire playing career as a Raven. He was inducted into the College Football Hall of Fame in 2012.

Early years
Ogden was born in Washington, D.C.  He received his education at St. Albans School in Washington, excelling not only in high school football but also in track and field.  He was a high school All-American in both football and track. He had high school-best throws of 19.23 meters (63.09 feet) in the shot put and 56.73 meters (186.12 feet) in the discus throw.

College career
Ogden decided to attend the University of California, Los Angeles (UCLA) instead of the University of Florida because the Bruins football coaches would let him participate in track and field.  As a sophomore, he helped UCLA to the 1993 Pac-10 Championship and Rose Bowl.  He later won the 1996 NCAA Men's Division I Indoor Track and Field Championships  in the shot put, with a personal best of 19.42 meters.  Ogden had an outstanding career with the Bruins football team, starting as a left tackle for four years.  In 23 games during his junior and senior years, he allowed just two sacks.  In 1995, Ogden received the Outland Trophy and the Morris Trophy, was the UPI Lineman of the Year, and was a unanimous All-American. Ogden's father, an investment banker, told his son to accept UCLA's decision to move him from right to left tackle.

Ogden's jersey was retired by UCLA, making him only the eighth player in school history to receive that honor. He was inducted into the UCLA Athletics Hall of Fame in 2006. On December 5, 2012 he was enshrined into the College Football Hall of Fame.

Professional career

During the 1996 NFL Draft, Ogden was selected by the Baltimore Ravens in the first round with the fourth overall choice, the first-ever draft pick made by the Ravens. Ozzie Newsome wanted to select Ogden but owner Art Modell wanted to select Lawrence Phillips. Phillips played in 3 NFL seasons and rushed for a career yardage total of 1,453.

He was named a four-time All-Pro and an 11-time Pro Bowler at left tackle, earning trips to Hawaii in every season except his rookie year. During his career, Ogden caught two passes – both for one yard and both for touchdowns. He also recovered 10 fumbles and recorded 10 tackles. Ogden also won a reputation for smiling. "He's a laugher," joked former New York Giants DE Michael Strahan. "You see him, you think to yourself this guy is not mean enough to handle the mean guys out there in the NFL.  Jonathan would rip your limbs off, and he'd smile...and wave your arm in front of you." Ogden also threw his helmet in frustration several times. He is widely considered one of the best tackles to ever play the game.

In 2001, Ogden won a Super Bowl ring with the Ravens when they defeated the New York Giants 34–7 in Super Bowl XXXV. Ogden announced his retirement on June 12, 2008 after a career that spanned 12 seasons, all with Baltimore. His retirement left Ray Lewis and Matt Stover as the last remaining Ravens from the team's inaugural season in Baltimore. At 6' 9", Ogden was tied with fellow Raven Jared Gaither and Bengals tackle Dennis Roland as the tallest player in the NFL at the end of his playing career.

Ogden served as the Ravens' honorary captain at Super Bowl XLVII, which saw his former team win their second world championship.

Personal life
Ogden married Kema Hunt in 2004. The couple resides in Las Vegas. In 2008, he established the Jonathan Ogden Foundation (now known as The Ogden Family Foundation) to benefit inner-city schools and help student-athletes take responsibility for their futures through lessons learned on the playing field, in the classroom, and throughout their local communities.

On May 1, 2000, Ogden appeared on WWF Raw along with members of the Baltimore Ravens and attempted to win the WWF Hardcore Championship from Crash Holly after Holly was attacked by Steve Blackman, but was unsuccessful. In September 2009, Ogden was selected to Sporting News' Magazine's Team of the Decade (2000's). In 2010, he was placed 72nd on the list of NFL's top 100 players.  He was present during the Ravens' Super Bowl XXXV reunion in 2010.

Ogden has starred in commercials for Apple Ford, a dealership in Columbia, Maryland, and during his playing career, he appeared in TV advertisements for GEBCO, a local car insurance company. He also appeared in a 2012 advertisement with Baltimore Mayor Stephanie Rawlings-Blake in support of Maryland Question 7.  The measure expanded gambling in the state.

He is the brother of offensive tackle and center Marques Ogden.

References

External links
 The Ogden Family Foundation
 
 
 

1974 births
Living people
American football offensive guards
American football offensive tackles
American male shot putters
Baltimore Ravens players
UCLA Bruins football players
UCLA Bruins men's track and field athletes
St. Albans School (Washington, D.C.) alumni
All-American college football players
American Conference Pro Bowl players
College Football Hall of Fame inductees
Pro Football Hall of Fame inductees
Track and field athletes in the National Football League
Players of American football from Washington, D.C.
African-American players of American football
21st-century African-American sportspeople
20th-century African-American sportspeople